Vicina was a town on the Danube used as a tradepost (Emporia) by the Republic of Genoa, being part of the Genoese trade empire between the 13th and 14th century. At one time, it was the most flourishing port of the maritime Danube, but its importance declined with the development of other ports such as Kilia and Brăila. Although many locations have been proposed by both historians and archeologists as the remains of Vicina, it is still unknown where 
this town was located.

Early history
The earliest reference to Vicina (Greek Βιτζίνα, Bitzina) is found in the Alexiad, written in 1148 by Anna Comnena, which described events from late 11th century. She mentions that it was ruled by two Pecheneg chieftains, Sesthlav and Satzas. Soon, trade flourished and Vicina was named a rich town by an Arab traveler.

In the 12th century, the Arab geographer al-Idrīsī called the town Disina.

Trade
The Mongol conquests led to a period of peace and stability (the so-called Pax Mongolica) which favored trade. Within the Black Sea region, merchants from Venice and Genoa were active, with the Venetians using existing towns as their tradeposts, while the Genoese preferred to create their own towns. Following the Treaty of Nymphaeum (1261), the Genoese gained the priority in the trade in the region.

The Genoese bought cereals, wax, fish and hides (which were produced in the Danubian regions and the Mongol-ruled steppes) and sold manufactured products such as Lombard cloth and linen, as well as spices, servicing the territories of Wallachia and Moldavia even before the founding of the states, as well as the Knyazate of Halych.

The town of Vicina, like other Genoese towns, was overseen by a consul.

Decline
At the end of the 14th century, Vicina was under Byzantine control, and according to a document from 1337-1338, it was ruled by "infamous heathens", presumably Mongols, Turks or Tatars. Soon after that, another document noted the rise and fall of the metropolis of Vicina, as Vicina was "plagued by barbarians" and had only a few Christians. In 1359, the Metropolitan Hyacinth of Vicina moved to Argeș with the approval of the Ecumenical Patriarch of Constantinople.

The commerce of Vicina was severely affected during the Genoese-Byzantine war of 1351–1352. After the war, the Byzantines lost the control of the Lower Danube to the Genoese, who gained control over the town of Kilia (today Chilia Veche, Romania) The decline of Vicina also led to the rise of another port on the Danube, Brăila, which became the largest port on the Danube in the region. This was also helped by the political stability within Wallachia, whereas Vicina was caught in fights between Mongols and Bulgarians, later also with the Turks.

Location
The exact location of Vicina is not yet known and it's a matter of debate among historians and archeologists. Portolan charts place it right after Drinago (which is assumed to be modern Brăila), south of the Danube. Based on this, many historians identified it with Isaccea, while archeologists identify it with Păcuiul lui Soare. Nevertheless, historians identified it with a variety of places:

 Isaccea: Nicolae Grămadă, Nicolae Bănescu, Gheorghe Moisescu, Ştefan Lupşa, Alexandru Filipaşcu, Constantin C. Giurescu
 Between Isaccea and Tulcea: Nicolae Iorga
 Niculițel: Constantin Brătescu
 Păcuiul lui Soare: Petre Diaconu
 Mahmudia: Gheorghe I. Brătianu
 Hârșova-Topalu area: Octavian Iliescu
 Vidin: Constantin N. Hurmuzaki
 Măcin: Wilhelm Tomaschek, Konstantin Jireček, Nicolae Dobrescu, J. Bromberg
 Nufăru: Georgi Atanasov
 somewhere in Albania: Alexandru D. Xenopol

Notes

References

Poncea, Traian-Valentin. Geneza orașului medieval românesc Extra-Carpatic (secolele X-XIV), Editura Biblioteca Bucureștilor, 1999, .
Rădvan, Laurențiu. At Europe's Borders: Medieval Towns in the Romanian Principalities, Brill, 2010, .

Populated places on the Danube
Genoese colonies
Lost cities and towns
Republic of Genoa
Former cities in Romania
Romania in the Early Middle Ages
Byzantine sites in Romania
Medieval Dobruja
Territories of the Republic of Genoa